Grain Media is a British film, television and commercials production company in South London, established in 2006 by Jon Drever and Orlando von Einsiedel. 

In 2020 the company's short film Learning to Skateboard in a Warzone (If You're a Girl) won the Academy Award for Best Documentary Short and the BAFTA for Best Short Film. In 2017 the company's short film The White Helmets won the Academy Award for Best Documentary Short. 

The feature-length documentary Virunga was nominated for Best Documentary at both BAFTA 2015 and the 87th Academy Awards.

Productions 
Learning to Skateboard in a Warzone (2019), short documentary
Lost and Found (2020), short documentary
Seahorse (2019), feature-length documentary
Evelyn (2018), feature-length documentary
Bruce Lee and the Outlaw (2018), feature-length documentary
The White Helmets (2016), short documentary 
SuperBob (2015), feature film
Virunga (2014), feature-length documentary
We Ride (2013), feature-length documentary
Skateistan: To Live And Skate Kabul (2010), short documentary
India’s Forbidden Love (2018), short documentary

References

Film production companies of the United Kingdom
Television production companies of the United Kingdom
Mass media companies established in 2006